"Lights Out at Eleven" is a song by Australian rock group Baby Animals. It was released in January 1994 as the third and final single from their second studio album Shaved and Dangerous (1993). It was the group's last single for 19 years.  The song peaked at number 54 on the ARIA Chart.

On the inside sleeve of the single is written:

"You can't confide in suicide 
You can't pretend it's a justified end 
Look for the spirit by your side 
He's holding hands with you my friend"

Track listings
CD single (743211681025)
 "Lights Out at Eleven" – 5:31
 "Indian Mystery" – 3:57

Charts

External links

References

1993 songs
1994 singles
Baby Animals songs
Songs written by Suze DeMarchi
Song recordings produced by Ed Stasium